Captain Underpants and the Wrath of the Wicked Wedgie Woman is the fifth book in the Captain Underpants series by Dav Pilkey. It was published on August 29, 2001. It features the reformation of George and Harold's formerly cruel teacher, Ms. Ribble, at the end using the 3-D Hypno Ring (which is used to hypnotize Mr. Krupp, causing him to become Captain Underpants in the first book) through reverse psychology, because the ring causes females to do the opposite of what the bearers of the ring force them to do.

Plot

Ms. Ribble announces that she is going to retire at the end of the school year and forces everyone to make happy retirement cards for her, but George and Harold make a Captain Underpants comic with her as "The Wicked Wedgie Woman" instead, and they got sent to Mr. Krupp's office for that. The boys are assigned to pass out the "Friday Memo", which they do with several humorous changes. They later convince Mr. Krupp to sign a blank retirement card, but later, having found out about their comic (and catching them changing a sign), he puts them in detention. Harold defiantly refuses to give Ms. Ribble the card, causing Mr. Krupp to seize it and plan to deliver it himself. At Ms. Ribble's retirement party (which everyone was forced to go to), Mr. Krupp hands over the letter, where it is revealed that Harold made it look like a marriage proposal from Mr. Krupp, having used reverse psychology to get Mr Krupp to deliver it. 

Having fallen into a state of catatonia because of the proposal (only saying "B-B-Bubba-Bobba. Hob-Hobba-Hobba-Wah-Wah!"), Mr. Krupp remains indifferent to the following chaotic school week. (The week involves none of the kids showing up on Monday, all the kids wearing their pajamas to school and picking their noses on Tuesday, some of the girls drawing a mustache on their faces with a permanent marker and taping egg salad sandwiches to their heads on Wednesday, kids having a food fight in the lunchroom and the football team wrecking the teachers' lounge on Thursday and every single kid wearing bumblebee costumes to school and making silly faces in yearbook photos on Friday.) At the wedding, just before they get married, Ms. Ribble breaks up with Mr. Krupp because he has a funny-looking nose (ironically, they both have the same nose shape). When Mr. Krupp says George and Harold tricked them, the boys run as Ms. Ribble goes into a blood-crazed rage and chases after them, causing the food on the tables to go flying into the guests (all the students and teachers) and causing the wedding cake to fall on her, though George and Harold are able to escape.

Later at school, Ms. Ribble reveals that she has illegally dropped their B and C grades to F's and G's (although in Harold's opinion, there is no such grade as a G), counting on them repeating the fourth grade after they flunk it. At the treehouse, George and Harold decide to use the 3-D Hypno-Ring to hypnotize her into returning their grades to normal, but while they are doing this, the book is interrupted by a local newscast, which reveals the police are shutting down the Ll'l Wiseguy Novelty Co. (which sells the rings) because the Hypno-Rings are now considered dangerous. Additionally, when a Hypno-Ring is used on a woman, a mental blunder causes her to do the opposite of what the bearer of the Hypno-Ring tells them to do. Back to the normal book, the boys, tell Ms. Ribble that she will "only change their grades and not do something crazy like turn into Wedgie Woman".

That night, Ms. Ribble arrives at George and Harold's treehouse as The Wicked Wedgie Woman, as they struggle, they accidentally spill Extra Strength Super-Power Juice into "Wedgie Woman's" head, which transforms her hair into several arms with the ability to give wedgies and increases her intelligence. She kidnaps the boys and takes them to her house, where she builds robot copies of them named Robo-George and the Harold 2000. The robots go to school where Mr. Krupp is filling in for Ms. Ribble. When Mr. Krupp snaps his fingers at Harold 2000 for kicking a ball into space, he turns himself into Captain Underpants and takes off shouting "Tra-La-Laaa!", causing the robots to increase in size and fly after him. Captain Underpants mistakes the robots for George and Harold, who then attack him with spray starch, which defeats him. Meanwhile, Wedgie Woman ties the boys to adjacent chairs and hangs a hatchet over them with a candle burning the rope, but instead of hurting George and Harold, the hatchet simply cuts through the ropes.

George and Harold find the wedgied Captain Underpants, convinced that he lost his powers. The newest store sells everything except fabric softener, so they make a comic about Captain Underpants' origin. He reads it, eventually seeing words he can say to free him of starch on the back. He says the words and defeats the robots. As Captain Underpants and Wedgie Woman face-off, Harold runs to the treehouse and comes back with the Hypno-ring. George runs to the "Everything Except Fabric Softener" store and returns with a box of spray bottles, shouting to Harold that he got "Extra-Strength Spray Starch" and that he was going to hide it. Wedgie Woman overhears, steals all the bottles, and sprays them at Captain Underpants. However, George reveals he used reverse psychology to trick Wedgie Woman into using hair remover, which made her and everyone else completely bald, removing her powers. George and Harold tell Captain Underpants to turn back into Mr. Krupp, and they then hypnotize Ms. Ribble by telling her to do the "opposite of the opposite" of what they want her to do, they tell her to always be Wedgie Woman, to not go back to being a teacher, to remember the last two weeks, to not change their grades back to normal, to keep her powers, to not become the nicest teacher in the school's history, and to not bake chocolate chip cookies for the class. Of course, she does the opposite of what is said, and at school, the next day is now portrayed as a happy and caring teacher who has ways to make class fun. George and Harold reflect on how her personality had changed for the better and that she may live longer now.

Comics

Comic 1: Captain Underpants and the Wrath of the Wicked Wedgie Woman
Ms. Ribble gives the students each 41 book reports as Christmas holiday homework. After Christmas, the book reports are turned in as a big pile, and fall on top of her, nearly killing her. She is transported to a hospital, where they rebuild her into a robot with a wedgie robo-claw inside. Captain Underpants appears but loses against The Wicked Wedgie Woman because she arms herself with spray starch, then hangs him on a pole. Some children walk by and catapult him into a pool, pouring fabric softener in it. Underpants creates a loop underneath The Wicked Wedgie Woman, causing the robo-claw to wedgie her instead of Underpants, who then flies her to jail.

Comic 2: The Origin of Captain Underpants
The second comic in the book starts with an introduction to Underpantyworld, Captain Underpants' fictional homeworld in which everyone only wears underwear. Suddenly, the Wedgie Warlords aboard the Starch Ship Enterprise appear intending to spray starch on Underpantyworld. However, the leader, "Big Daddy Long Johns", reveals a magic amulet that is able to protect the entire planet from the starch. However, he drops it and it gets swallowed by his son, "Little Baby Underpants" (later revealed to be Captain Underpants), so the entire planet is doomed. Big Daddy Long Johns and his wife, "Princess Pantyhose", decide to save their son. Stretching his underwear, Big Daddy Long Johns and Princess Pantyhose slingshot Little Baby Underpants away, while Underpantyworld is destroyed. Little Baby Underpants lands on Earth and is adopted by two old people, who name him "Captain", after their favorite cereal. As he grows up, Captain feels isolated from other children, since he only wears underwear. At night, Captain has a dream, where he meets his parents, who reveal that because he has the amulet still inside him, he is invulnerable to starch. All he has to do is shout the sentence "I summon the power of Underpantyworld!", and he will overcome the powers of starch. He becomes a superhero named Captain Underpants and never becomes afraid of starch anymore. The comic ends and in the real world, Captain Underpants shouts out the sentence to free himself in real life.

Characters
 George Beard – A 4th-grade student at Jerome Horwitz Elementary School who is Harold’s best friend.
 Harold Hutchins – A 4th-grade student at Jerome Horwitz Elementary School who is George's best friend. 
 Benjamin Krupp – The mean principal of Jerome Horwitz Elementary School.
 Captain Underpants – Mr. Krupp's alter ego.
 Tara ribble/Wedgie Woman – George and Harold's mean teacher of Jerome Horwitz Elementary School. In this book, she was going to retire from her job, but George and Harold prank her into marrying Mr. Krupp. When she hears that it's George and Harold's fault, she goes into a rage, attempting to "grind the boys into head cheese" and destroying the wedding, making a mess in the gym. The next day, Tara Ribble gives them a super bad grade of F's and G's. To avoid flunking 4th grade, George and Harold hypnotize her into Wedgie Woman, unaware that what they're saying is the opposite of what she's going to do. At night, Ribble, disguised as Wedgie Woman, attempts to attack the boys. Along with the help of her lookalike robots of George and Harold and her clawed dreadlocks created by the superpower juice from Book 3, Wedgie Woman attempts to rule the world, turning to "Wedgieville", where she gives wedgies to all the people, including Captain Underpants. When George and Harold return the powers to Captain Underpants from their second comic, he destroys Robo George and The Harold 2000. George uses reverse psychology by labeling the hair-remover spray as extra strength super starch. When Wedgie Woman sprays it, everyone's hair is gone. To make up to Wedgie Woman, George and Harold hypnotize her into a nicer Ms. Ribble, telling her the opposite of what she's going to do. The next day at school, a nice Ms. Ribble give the class a lesson on how to make comics.
 Miss Anthrope – The school secretary, who forces George and Harold to copy the Friday Memo.
 Mr. Meaner – The gym teacher of Jerome Horwitz Elementary School.
 Mr. Rected – The guidance counselor.
 Ms. Guided – A teacher of Jerome Horwitz Elementary School.
 Miss Fitt – Another teacher of Jerome Horwitz Elementary School.
 Mr. Rustworthy – The music teacher (implied by his tie.)
 Ms. Dayken – Another teacher of Jerome Horwitz Elementary School.
 Melvin Sneedly – George and Harold's nemesis and Jerome Horwitz Elementary School nerd and tattletale.
 Ingrid Ashley/Chim-Chim Diaperbrains – The newscaster of Channel 4 Eyewitness News.
 Larry Zarrow/Booger Stinkersquirt – The reporter of Channel 4 Eyewitness News.
 Aaron Mancini – A student of Jerome Horwitz Elementary School.
 Stephanie Yarkoff – A student of Jerome Horwitz Elementary School.
 Police Officer – A policeman who is hung up by Wedgie Woman.
 Syd Macaroni – The lead policeman.
 The Rabbi - The priest of the prank wedding.

2001 American novels
Captain Underpants novels
Scholastic Corporation books